La Diosa Coronada (The Crowned Goddess) is a Spanish-language telenovela produced by the United States-based television network Telemundo and RTI Colombia.

Telemundo is airing the serial from Monday to Friday about 10 weeks. As with most of its other soap operas, the network broadcasts English subtitles as closed captions on CC3. It will air 10:30 p.m. on Telemundo, sharing 1 hour slot with Donde Esta Elisa. It will occupy the whole slot after Elisa ended. From August 28, 2012 the series aired on Zone Romantica in Central & Eastern Europe.

Background
The story is based on Angie Sanclemente Valencia's involvement in the transportation of cocaine from Argentina to Europe.

Cast

Main 
 Carolina Guerra as Raquel Santamaria Cruz
 Arap Bethke as Genaro Castilblanco
 Jonathan Islas as Kevin Avarado
 Carolina Gaitán as Valeria
 Rodolfo Valdés as Darío
 Margarita Reyes as Katya
 Carlos Camacho as Roger
 Luces Velásquez as Doña Matilde Cruz
 Alberto Palacio as Don Neron
 Valentina Lizcano as Adelaida Páez
 John Mario Rivera as Guzmán
 Angeline Moncayo as Zulma
 Katherine Porto as Norida Beltrán
 Giovanni Galindo as Ernesto / Siniestro
 Pedro Falla as Capitán Castro

Recurring 
 Lincoln Palomeque as Lucas
 Diego Narváez Rincón as Kathya's client
 Adriana López as Priscila
 Mafe Barreto as Sofía

References

External links
 

2010 telenovelas
2010 American television series debuts
2010 American television series endings
American television series based on telenovelas
Colombian telenovelas
RTI Producciones telenovelas
Telemundo telenovelas
2010 Colombian television series debuts
2010 Colombian television series endings
Spanish-language American telenovelas